Stephen Vincent Sundborg, S.J. (born 1943) is an American Jesuit and theologian.  He served as the 21st President of Seattle University from July 1997 to July 2021.

Sundborg was raised in the Territory of Alaska.  His father,  George Walter Sundborg (1913-2009), was a newspaper reporter and editor, and longtime assistant to Ernest Gruening when Governor and U.S. Senator from the new State of Alaska.  George Sundborg was a delegate to the Alaska State Constitutional convention in 1955–56, where, as Chairman of the Committee on Style and Drafting, he was responsible for selecting most of the words in that document.

Stephen Sundborg entered the Society of Jesus in 1961 and was ordained a Roman Catholic Jesuit priest in 1974 in Seattle.  In 1982, he obtained a doctorate in spirituality from the Pontifical Gregorian University in Rome.  He taught theology at Seattle University from 1982 until 1990, when he was appointed the Provincial of the Northwest Jesuits, a position he held until 1996. Sundborg also served as the rector of the Jesuit community at Seattle University beginning in 1986.

In July 1997, Father Sundborg became the 21st President of Seattle University.    He is well known around campus as "Father Steve," a nickname used by all at SU. In 2017 the Trustees appointed him to another 5-year term.  In 2019 he notified the Trustees of his hope to retire in 2021.
 
On June 30, 2021, Steve retired from the Presidency of Seattle University.  His 24 years as President set a longevity record among all presidents of colleges and universities then serving in the State of Washington.  He has been given a full year of complete freedom, and in 2021 is traveling the United States and Europe.  In mid-2022, his Jesuit Northwest Province superior will give him a new assignment.  Steve, now only 78, says he is ready for one more challenge before full retirement.

Father Sundborg was succeeded by Eduardo Peñalver as the President of Seattle University on July 1, 2021.  Penalver is the first non-Jesuit President of the university.

Controversy 
In October 2019, Seattle University removed references to Planned Parenthood as a student resource from its website, after anti-abortion group Students for Life of America sent a letter to Sundborg and other university leaders in August 2019 arguing that Planned Parenthood had "no place on a Christian campus" as an "abortion corporation".
An excerpt from Sundberg's email response to the request to remove references to Planned Parenthood:

Sundborg also "refused an in-person interview when approached by Spectator reporters on Oct. 3 and refused a phone interview with The Spectator on Oct. 4 or over the weekend".
Sundborg issued a statement responding to the controversy, reading in part:
 
On October 9, 2019, Sundborg sent an email message to the Seattle University Community with additional statements about his decision, which read in part:

References

20th-century American Jesuits
21st-century American Jesuits
Living people
Educators from Seattle
People of the Alaska Territory
Presidents of Seattle University
Seattle University faculty
1943 births